Big Loada is an EP by English electronic musician Squarepusher. It was released on 21 July 1997 by Warp in the United Kingdom. It was later released, with an expanded track listing, on 13 October 1998 by Nothing Records in the United States.

Release
Big Loada served as Squarepusher's fourth release on Warp in the United Kingdom, following the Port Rhombus EP, the "Vic Acid" single, and the album Hard Normal Daddy.

The Nothing Records issue of Big Loada has a rearranged track listing with additional tracks unavailable in the United States at the time. Warp had not opened their American division yet, and arranged to release some of their material through Nothing. The rearrangement of the tracks is to highlight the "Come On My Selector" video, directed by Chris Cunningham, and which was included on the re-release. Tracks 8, 9 and 10 make up the full Port Rhombus EP, Jenkinson's first release on Warp. Tracks 11 and 12 are two B-sides to the "Vic Acid" single (although the G7000 mix of "Fat Controller" was not included on this release). This edition has modified cover artwork, as the prominent Warp Records logo had to be removed.

Some Nothing Records versions of Big Loada are actually copies of Budakhan Mindphone that have been incorrectly packaged and labelled.

Reception

In 2017, Pitchfork placed Big Loada at number 9 on its list of "The 50 Best IDM Albums of All Time".

Track listing

Warp edition

Nothing edition

Charts

References

1997 EPs
1997 remix albums
Squarepusher remix albums
Squarepusher EPs
Remix EPs
Warp (record label) remix albums
Warp (record label) EPs
Nothing Records albums